The Schomberg Cougars are a junior ice hockey team based in Schomberg, Ontario, Canada.  They played in the Georgian Mid-Ontario Junior C Hockey League until 2016 when the league merged into the Provincial Junior Hockey League.

History
The Schomberg Cougars Hockey Club was founded in 1969 as a member of the Eastern Junior D League, but moved to the South-Central Junior D Hockey League in 1971.  The founders were John Archibald, George Crane, Geoff Hogan, and Len Taylor.  There had been a Junior team from the Metro Junior B Hockey League playing for a few years in the early 1960s.
In 1971 Archibald visited eight adjoining municipalities to encourage them to enter junior teams and from that Alliston, Bradford, Keswick, and Orangeville came on board.
Len Taylor coached the team for six years and carried out the duties of president at the same time.  John Archibald was secretary-treasurer for 15 years as well as team manager for a few years.  Geoff Hogan acted as vice-president before moving to Calgary in 1973.  George Crane was a director for three years and managed the team in its inaugural year.

In 1973, the Cougars and their league were promoted, as the league became the Central Ontario Junior C Hockey League.  Three seasons later, the league became the Mid-Ontario Junior C Hockey League.

In 1994, the Mid-Ontario Junior C Hockey League merged with the Georgian Bay Junior C Hockey League.  The Cougars continued as members, but the league was dominated by teams like the Stayner Siskins and the Fergus Devils.

The year-to-year play of the Cougars could be considered as inconsistent, but in 2002-03 the Cougars finished the regular season in a three-way tie for second place. They went on to win their first and only Georgian Mid-Ontario Junior C championship that year, after defeating Erin in seven games in the semi finals, as well as Stayner (first place team) in six games.  That year the Cougars had the three top scorers in the league. The Cougars did not manage to reach the Clarence Schmalz Cup finals after losing in four straight games to the Hanover Barons of the Western Ontario Junior C Hockey League.

The 2005-06 season saw the Cougars finish in fifth place in the Georgian Mid-Ontario League.  They entered the playoffs against the fourth seeded Erin Shamrocks.  The Shamrocks made quick work of the Cougars, finishing the series four games to one.

The 2006-07 season had the Cougars finishing in sixth place.  In the league quarter-finals, the Cougars faced the Alliston Hornets, losing four games to none.

Season-by-season standings

2000-2004
2004–Present

References

External links
Schomberg Cougars Official Website

Georgian Mid-Ontario Junior C Hockey League teams
Sport in King, Ontario
Ice hockey clubs established in 1969
1969 establishments in Ontario